Sanda Mamić (born 22 March 1985) is a retired female tennis player and current full-time gaming streamer on Twitch from Croatia.

Early career
 2001 – reached final at ITF Hvar/CRO
 2002 – reached final at ITF Sopron/HUN
 2003 – won first ITF Circuit title at ITF Yamaguchi/JPN; also reached final at ITF Makarska/CRO
 2004 – best career finish, reaching quarterfinals at Budapest. Mamić, ranked world No. 201, entered the main draw as a qualifier. Budapest was her WTA Tour main-draw debut, whereupon she defeated Gala León García and Tathiana Garbin en route, eventually losing to Flavia Pennetta in three sets.

In Seoul, she qualified and lost again, in the quarterfinals to Anne Kremer.

After qualifying at Moscow, Mamić notched her best win versus world No. 28, Mary Pierce, winning 6–0, 6–4 before losing to Elena Dementieva.

In May 2004, Mamić had her Grand Slam debut, reaching the main draw at the French Open through qualifying. She would lose in the first round.

Later in the year, she had her top-100 debut on 18 October at world No. 96, reaching career-high at the time to world No. 95 a week later.

In 2005, Mamić reached third singles quarterfinal at Modena, losing in a third-set tiebreaker to eventual finalist Garbin.

She managed to reach the second round four times, including Rome, where she defeated world No. 23, Daniela Hantuchová, and later losing to Pierce, and the French Open, where she eventually lost in the second round to Dementieva.

During the rest of the year, she lost in the first round six times, including the other three Grand Slam tournaments.

In September, she was invited to Croatian Fed Cup team for their match against Thailand. Although she lost both singles rubbers to Tamarine Tanasugarn and Suchanan Viratprasert, Croatia prevailed 3–2.

Late career
Later in her career, Mamić had problems with her wrist, which at first was thought to be a regular sport injury requiring only a short term break. Her ranking was protected for the next ten months. But further complications with her injury, talk about a mysterious bacteria that infected her wrist wound, and liver complications took her off the courts for more than two years. Her tennis career seemed almost over, and she moved on and started to work for a web design company.

But in 2008, she came back to the courts. Her comeback began at the Bangalore Open in March where she won her first-round match against Chan Yung-jan (6–2, 6–2), but lost in the second round to then-No. 1 in the world, Jelena Janković (2–6, 2–6).
Mamić reached the second round in her Grand Slam comeback at the French Open, beating Michaëlla Krajicek (6–4, 6–3) before falling to Francesca Schiavone.

ITF Circuit finals

Singles: 6 (3 titles, 3 runner-ups)

Doubles: 3 (1 title, 2 runner-ups)

Grand Slam singles performance timeline

References

Current career
Sanda is currently a content creator and full-time gaming streamer on Twitch under the name Sansen (sansensworld) playing PUBG, League of Legends, Dead by Daylight, World of Warcraft, etc.

She had a lot of notable gaming results:
PUBG Broadcaster Royale S2 (Q1 - #10, Q2 - #4, LAN finals San Jose - #21 duo); qualified as the only female player from Europe
1st LAN female PUBG tournament, Shanghai CHINA (#4 duo)
PUBG challengermode (#1 solo)
PUBG Girl Gamer Royale S1 (#5 duo)
PUBG Twitch Rivals (charity & regular)

She promotes PLUR (Peace Love Unity Respect) ideology and is known for providing the FEEL GOOD content across media platforms.

External links
 
 
 

1981 births
Living people
Croatian female tennis players
Tennis players from Zagreb